Georgetown Visitation Preparatory School is a private Roman Catholic college-preparatory school for girls located in the historic Washington, D.C. neighborhood of Georgetown. Founded in 1799 by the Order of the Visitation of Holy Mary (also known as the Visitation Sisters), it is one of the oldest continuously-operating schools for girls in the country and the city as well as the oldest Catholic school for girls in the original Thirteen Colonies. It is located within the Archdiocese of Washington.

History
Georgetown Visitation was founded in 1799. It is the oldest Catholic school for girls in the original 13 colonies. The school opened near Georgetown College because its fourth President, Father Leonard Neale, S.J., (later Bishop and Archbishop) co-founded the Academy and Convent. He invited Alice Lalor, Maria McDermott and Maria Sharpe to join him; these founders would come to be called "The Three Pious Ladies."  

Rome recognized the Georgetown Visitation Order in 1816; on May 24, 1828, the Sisters were incorporated by Congress, an act signed by President John Quincy Adams, who, a few months later, handed out awards at the commencement exercises. By this time, students were learning geography, history, mythology, astronomy, chemistry, French, Spanish, and vocal & instrumental music. 

From 1800 to 1862, Georgetown Visitation subsidized its mission by the forced labor and sale of enslaved people, 121 of whom have been identified, either by name or brief description. Primary sources tell of manumissions, self-emancipations, and the freeing of all people whom Visitation enslaved with the District of Columbia Emancipation Act on April 16, 1862. 

The school continued to grow and evolve in the 20th century, focusing on high school and Junior College students. Beloved traditions such as Marshmallow Roast, a good-natured class competition with skits that "roast" faculty, and Gold-White, a school-wide intramural athletic competition, began in the early decades of this century. By the mid-sixties, the school started seeing a decline in the number of resident students and Junior College students; the Junior College was closed in 1964 and the boarding school was closed in 1975.

Fire and rebuilding
On July 8–9, 1993, a fire destroyed the historic main academic building of the campus, the Starkweather Academy Building, causing an initially estimated $3.5 million in damages. Trailers were brought in to serve as temporary classrooms in time for the start of the 1993–1994 academic year. The building was restored and rededicated as Founders Hall on May 5, 1995. Since then, the campus has been revitalized with the Catharine E. Nolan Center for the Performing Arts and the Sarah and Charles T. Fisher Athletic Center completed for the bicentennial of the school in 1999, and the renovation of both St. Joseph's Hall and the St. Bernard Library in 2002 and 2003. In 2019 ,the school opened Berchmans Hall, named for Sister Mary Berchmans Hannan, VHM, '48 & '50, a two-story addition to St. Joseph's Hall with classrooms, science labs, and an art studio. The covered walkway between St. Bernard Library and St. Joseph’s Hall became the Saints Connector, with common areas and the McNabb Innovation Lab, named for Sister Mary de Sales McNabb, VHM, '48. Modern facilities are located side-by-side with historic buildings boasting a myriad of architectural styles, ranging from Victorian to Neo-Gothic.

Traditions
Visitation traditionally held its graduation ceremonies in the Odeon, an auditorium where John Quincy Adams addressed the graduates of 1828. After the Odeon was destroyed in the fire of Founder's Hall, graduation ceremonies were moved to Georgetown University’s Gaston Hall.

Georgetown Visitation Monastery

Notable alumnae

Bay Buchanan, treasurer of the United States
Emily Warren Roebling, known for her contribution to the completion of the Brooklyn Bridge
Marian Canney (1921–2019), faculty member and Korean War widow
Ella Loraine Dorsey (1853–1935), author, journalist, translator
Jennifer Dougherty, first female mayor of Frederick, Maryland
Margaret Durante, country music artist
Mary Early, sculptor
Harriet Lane, U.S. first lady
Sister Margarita of Jesus, Princess of Mexico; daughter of Agustin de Iturbide, Emperor of Mexico
Liz McCartney, cofounder of the St. Bernard Project, 2008 CNN Hero of the Year
Harriet Monroe, founder and editor of Poetry magazine
Bertha Honore Palmer, (1849–1918), impressionist art collector, entrepreneuse, philanthropist
Evan Ryan, assistant for intergovernmental affairs and public liaison for vice president Joe Biden
Alice Smith, singer

Popular culture
In 1850, John H. Hewitt wrote the Grand Promenade March and dedicated it to the "Sisters of the Academy of Visitation, Georgetown."

References

External links

 

Visitation schools
1799 establishments in Washington, D.C.
Preparatory schools in Washington, D.C.
Educational institutions established in 1799
Visitation Preparatory School
Private high schools in Washington, D.C.
Independent School League
Girls' schools in Washington, D.C.
Catholic secondary schools in Washington, D.C.
Georgetown (Washington, D.C.)
Italianate architecture in Washington, D.C.
Colonial Revival architecture in Washington, D.C.
Federal architecture in Washington, D.C.
School buildings on the National Register of Historic Places in Washington, D.C.